Olive Oil Times is an independent industry publication based in Newport, Rhode Island with offices in New York founded by Curtis Cord in 2010. It is the most-read source of information about olive oil.

The company organizes the New York International Olive Oil Competition, the world's largest olive oil quality contest and has been used as a source for National Geographic, The New York Times, Fortune magazine and the Columbia Journalism Review.

References

External links
 Olive Oil Times website

Business magazines published in the United States
Lifestyle magazines published in the United States
Weekly magazines published in the United States
Food and drink magazines
Magazines established in 2010
Magazines published in Rhode Island
Professional and trade magazines